Eoginkgoites is an extinct form genus of bennettitalean leaves from the Late Triassic of North America. Despite its palmate (hand-shaped) appearance similar to some early gingko species, it belongs to a different gymnosperm order, the Bennettitales. The leaf is deeply segmented into five to seven narrow, club-shaped lobes (pinnae or leaflets) which twist around a very short rhachis. This leads to an overall fan-shaped leaf (similar to a ginkgo but much more strongly segmented) situated at the end of a long petiole (leaf stalk). The leaf has paracytic stomata (with subsidiary cells laterally flanking the guard cells) and veins which strongly branch and lead to a marginal vein at the edge of each leaflet. These structural traits are all shared with benettitaleans. Williamsonia carolinensis, an ovule-bearing bennettitalean cone, has been found closely associated with Eoginkgoites leaves, seemingly confirming its benettitalean identity.

References 

Bennettitales
Triassic plants
Prehistoric plant genera